The 1935 Austin Kangaroos football team was an American football team represented Austin College as a member of the Texas Conference during the 1935 college football season. Led by Bill Pierce in his first season as head coach, the team compiled an overall record of 7–2–2 with a mark of 4–0–2 in conference play, winning the program's first and only Texas Conference championship. Talmadge Crook was the team's captain. Austin lost its first two games of the season, both on the road. The second was a 60–0 rout in Dallas by SMU, who won the Southwest Conference title and was recognized as a national champion.

Schedule

References

Austin
Austin Kangaroos football seasons
Austin Kangaroos football